Roodstown Castle is a 15th-century tower house and National Monument located in County Louth, Ireland.

Location

History

Roodstown Castle was built in the 15th century, standing at a strategic point between the River Glyde, River Dee, Ardee and the Irish Sea. It is similar to, although taller than, the ten-pound castles built under Henry VI. It is locally associated with the Taaffe family.

Building

Roodstown Castle is a rectangular tower house of four storeys with small turrets at diagonally opposed corner: a spiral stairway in the SE and garderobes in the NW.

The castle contained a vaulted ground-floor cellar or storage space, a murder-hole, a crenellated parapet, chemin de ronde.

The upper floors have large ogee windows and fireplaces.

References

National Monuments in County Louth
Castles in County Louth